Joseph Ashton may refer to:

Joseph Ashton (actor) (born 1986), American actor
Joe Ashton (Joseph William Ashton, born 1933), former British MP